Mário Manuel da Silva (born 23 July 1961 in Madina do Boe, Guinea-Bissau) is a retired Portuguese runner who specialized in the 1500 metres. He won a bronze medal at the 1991 World Indoor Championships behind Noureddine Morceli and Fermín Cacho. That indoor season Silva ran in 3:36.46 minutes, which placed him third in the world ranking, again behind Morceli and Cacho.

Achievements

References

sports-reference

1961 births
Living people
Portuguese male middle-distance runners
Athletes (track and field) at the 1988 Summer Olympics
Athletes (track and field) at the 1992 Summer Olympics
Olympic athletes of Portugal
Portuguese sportspeople of Bissau-Guinean descent
European Athletics Championships medalists
European Games competitors for Portugal